Baron George Hoyningen-Huene (September 4, 1900 – September 12, 1968) was a fashion photographer of the 1920s and 1930s. He was born in the Russian Empire to Baltic German and American parents and spent his working life in France, England and the United States.

Europe

Born in Saint Petersburg, Russia on September 4, 1900,  Hoyningen-Huene was the only son of Baron Barthold Theodor Hermann (Theodorevitch) von Hoyningen-Huene (1859-1942), a Baltic nobleman, military officer and lord of Navesti manor (near Võhma), and his wife, Emily Anne "Nan" Lothrop (1860-1927), a daughter of George Van Ness Lothrop, an American minister to Russia. (The couple was married in Detroit, Michigan, in 1888.) He had two sisters. Helen (died 1976) became a fashion designer in France and the United States, using the name Helen de Huene. Elizabeth (1891-1973), also known as Betty, also became a fashion designer (using the name Mme. Yteb in the 1920s and 1930s).

During the Russian Revolution, the Hoyningen-Huenes fled first to London, and later to Paris. By 1925 George had already worked his way up to chief of photography of the French Vogue where he was mentor to up-and-coming photographers including François Tuefferd. In 1931 he met Horst, the future photographer, who became his lover and frequent model and traveled to England with him that winter. While there, they visited photographer Cecil Beaton, who was working for the British edition of Vogue. In 1931, Horst began his association with Vogue, publishing his first photograph in the French edition in November of that year.

United States

In 1935 Hoyningen-Huene moved to New York City where he did most of his work for Harper's Bazaar.  He published two art books on Greece and Egypt before relocating to Hollywood, where he earned a living by shooting glamorous portraits for the film industry.

Hoyningen-Huene worked in huge studios and with whatever lighting worked best. Beyond fashion, he was a portraitist of Hollywood stars and other celebrities.

He also worked in Hollywood in various capacities in the film industry, working closely with George Cukor, notably as special visual and color consultant for the 1954 Judy Garland movie A Star Is Born. He served a similar role for the 1957 film Les Girls, which starred Kay Kendall and Mitzi Gaynor, the Sophia Loren film Heller in Pink Tights, and The Chapman Report.

He died at 68 years of age in Los Angeles.

Photography 

 Fashion: As a Chief Photographer of both Vogue and Harper's Bazaar, he photographed brands such as Chanel, Balenciaga, and Lanvin. 
 Portraits: Hoyningen-Huene photographed celebrities, artists, actors, and actresses.
 Nudes: He photographed nudes using the sculpture and architecture of Greece as inspiration.
 Travel: A frequent traveler as part of his fashion photograpy work, he documented his travels to Greece and North Africa.

Publications
 Egypt by [Baron] George Hoyningen-Huene with text by George Steindorff.  J. J. Augustin Publisher, 1943
Hellas: A Tribute to Classical Greece 64 Photographs by Hoyningen-Huene, with text by Hugh Chisholm. J. J. Augustin Publishers, 1943
Eye for Elegance - George Hoyningen-Huene (exhibition catalogue) International Center of Photography and Congreve Publishing Company, 1980
The Photographic Art of Hoyningen-Huene by William Ewing, George Hoyningen-Huene.  Thames & Hudson, 1998
” Mexican Heritage “ by George Hoyningen-Huene, with text by Alfonso Reyes, J.J. Augustin Publishers Corporation, 1946

Filmography (1950s-60s)

Miscellaneous crew
 The Adventures of Hajji Baba (1954) color consultant
 A Star Is Born (1954) special color design advisor
 Bhowani Junction (1956) color consultant 
 Les Girls (1957) color coordinator 
 It Started in Naples (1960) title designer 
 Heller in Pink Tights (1960) color coordinator and technical advisor
 Let's Make Love (1960) color coordinator
... also known as The Billionaire
... also known as The Millionaire
 A Breath of Scandal (1960) color advisor
... also known as Olympia (Italy)
 The Chapman Report (1962) color consultant - designer, title designer
 A New Kind of Love (1963) color coordinator - designer

Costume designer
 A Breath of Scandal (1960) 
... also known as Olympia (Italy)

References

External links 
 George Hoyningen-Huene : Fotografo (Spanish language)
 Exhibition Shadow and Light at Staley-Wise Gallery
 George Hoyningen-Huene at aenigma
 Location of the Navesti manor in Governorate of Livonia
 Barthold von Hoyningen-Huene in Baltic Nobility Handbook
 Collection Guide, George Hoyningen-Huene Photographs, Houghton Library, Harvard University
 George Hoyningen-Huene Estate Archives

1900 births
1968 deaths
Photographers from Saint Petersburg
Portrait photographers
Fashion photographers
Gay photographers
Russian gay artists
Russian LGBT photographers
Baltic German people from the Russian Empire
Baltic-German people
Baltic nobility
Russian people of Estonian descent
Russian people of American descent
People from Livonia
20th-century Russian LGBT people
White Russian emigrants to France